"Limelight" is a song by the Canadian progressive rock band Rush. It first appeared on the 1981 album Moving Pictures. The song's lyrics were written by Neil Peart with music written by Geddy Lee and Alex Lifeson. "Limelight" expresses Peart's discomfort with Rush's success and the resulting attention from the public. The song paraphrases the opening lines of the "All the world's a stage" speech from William Shakespeare's play As You Like It. The band had previously used the phrase for its 1976 live album. The lyrics also refer to "the camera eye", the title of the song that follows on the Moving Pictures album.

"Limelight" was one of five Rush songs inducted into the Canadian Songwriters Hall of Fame on March 28, 2010. It was listed at No. 435 on Rolling Stone's "Top 500 Greatest Songs of All Time" in 2021.

Background
In "Limelight", lyricist Neil Peart comments on the band's commercial success and the fame and its demands that come with rock star status.  According to guitarist Alex Lifeson, the song is about "being under the microscopic scrutiny and the need for privacy—trying to separate the two and not always being successful at it". Bassist Geddy Lee describes the motivation for "Limelight" in a 1988 interview:

In a 2007 interview, Alex Lifeson gives his take on "Limelight":

Record World said that it has "buzzsaw guitar and vocal dynamics" that should appeal to pop radio.

Recording and live performance
Lifeson's guitar solo was performed on what he called a "Hentor Sportscaster", a modified Fender Stratocaster equipped with a Floyd Rose vibrato arm. Critics frequently point out Lifeson's use of vibrato in the solo, with Max Mobley writing that it "is dripping with Floyd Rose whammy". "Limelight" has been described as Lifeson's "signature song", and critics cite the influence of Allan Holdsworth. Lifeson himself calls it his favourite solo.

The song was a staple of Rush's live performances, having been played on every tour since its release except the Grace Under Pressure Tour (1984),  the Presto Tour (1990), and the R40 Live Tour (2015).

Personnel

Rush
Geddy Lee - bass, vocals, synthesizers
Alex Lifeson - electric and acoustic guitars
Neil Peart - drums, percussion

Additional Personnel
Terry Brown: uncredited backing vocals

Production
Rush
Terry Brown

Appearances in popular culture
The song was featured in the films Sonny, Used Cars, That's My Boy, I Love You, Man, and Fanboys. The latter two films also feature the song "Tom Sawyer".
Both a cover and the original version of the song are available as downloadable tracks for the music video game series Rock Band, the latter being bundled with the rest of the Moving Pictures album. It is also playable in Guitar Hero: Warriors of Rock and Guitar Hero Live.
Upon the band's entrance into the Rock and Roll Hall of Fame, a slightly edited version of the song was used in the intro for CBC's Hockey Night in Canada on April 20, 2013.
In an episode of the USA Network sitcom Playing House ("Drumline", Season 1, Episode 5), "Limelight" plays over the last scene.

Chart performance

Weekly charts

Year-end charts

See also
List of Rush songs

References

1981 singles
Rush (band) songs
Music videos directed by Bruce Gowers
Songs written by Alex Lifeson
Songs written by Geddy Lee
Songs written by Neil Peart
Song recordings produced by Terry Brown (record producer)
1980 songs
Mercury Records singles